was a Japanese band formed in 1996.

In March 2000, Young Punch and Penpals released their split album, "Young Punch/Penpals", and in April–May went on tour together.

In August of that year, while still with BMG Funhouse, Young Punch founded a new label, FLATURBO. They made their major debut in November with the single "SUNDAY BEST".

The band split up in 2002.

Members
 (Vocals)
 (Bass/Vocals)
 (Drums/Chorus)

Discography

Singles
YOUNG WORLD (May 25, 1999/Libra Records)
NEO KIDS (March 8, 2000/VAP) Oricon #33
SUNDAY BEST (October 25, 2000/Arista Japan) Oricon #80
DISCONISTA (June 6, 2001/Arista Japan) Recut single
 (November 21, 2001/Arista Japan)
Love is in the air (May 29, 2002/BMG JAPAN)

Albums
YOUNG PUNCH/PENPALS (August 3, 2000/VAP) Oricon #33
DISCONISTA (May 23, 2001/Arista Japan) Oricon #58
 (June 26, 2002/BMG JAPAN) Oricon #97
YOUNG PUNCH LIVE (2002年09月25日/BMG JAPAN)

DVDs
YOUNG PUNCH LIVE (October 23, 2002/BMG JAPAN)
Their last live performance, recorded at the LIQUIDROOM in Shinjuku on August 1, 2002.

TV performances
TBS "BLITZ INDEX" (May 26, 2001)
TXN "Melodix!" (June 1, 2001 / December 11, 2001 / July 12, 2002)
TBS "CDTV-Neo" (June 8, 2001)

References

Japanese rock music groups
Musical groups established in 1996
Musical groups disestablished in 2002